Richard Clements may refer to:

 Richard Clements (journalist) (1928–2006), UK journalist, former editor of Tribune
 Richard Clements (painter) (1951–1999), Australian painter
 Richard Clements, American wrestler, ring name Quicksilver

See also
 Dick Clement (born 1937), English writer
 Richard Clement (courtier), English courtier
 Richard Clement (cricketer), English cricketer